The following is an incomplete list of people from Allied countries suspected of treachery or treason during World War II. It is not a list of Nazi war criminals.

Canada
Kanao Inouye - Guilty, executed on 27 August 1947

New Zealand
Captain Patrick Stanley Vaughan Heenan - Guilty of treason, shot on 13 February 1942, at Keppel Harbour, Singapore (extrajudicial execution).
Roy Nicolas Courlander -  a British-born New Zealand soldier with a history of petty crime, he was taken prisoner during the Greece campaign in April 1941.  Attracted by his anti-communist views, the Germans recruited him for the Waffen-SS British Free Corps, where Courlander reached the rank of Unterscharführer. He was tried at the end of the war by court martial by the New Zealand military authorities in Westgate-on-Sea near Margate in Kent, England, and sentenced to 15 years of prison.

United Kingdom
John Amery -  Civilian - Guilty of treason, executed on 19 December 1945
George Johnson Armstrong - Civilian - Guilty of treachery, executed on 10 July 1941
Harold Cole - Soldier - A con man, thief and deserter who betrayed escaped airmen and French Resistance members to the Gestapo - killed by French Police 1946.
Thomas Haller Cooper - member of Waffen-SS - Guilty of treason, sentence of death was commuted to life imprisonment - released 1953
Oswald John Job - Civilian - London-born son of German parents - "may well have been an informer" within St Denis internment camp- Guilty of treachery, executed on 16 March 1944. 
William Joyce - Civilian - American-born with Irish ancestry. The Attorney General, Sir Hartley Shawcross, successfully argued that Joyce's possession of a British passport, even though he had misstated his nationality to get it, entitled him until it expired to British diplomatic protection in Germany, and therefore he owed allegiance to the King at the time he commenced working for the Germans. Guilty of treason, executed on 3 January 1946. Nicknamed "Lord Haw-Haw."
Dorothy O'Grady - Civilian - Guilty of treachery, sentenced to death but on appeal the sentence was commuted to 14 years’ penal servitude.
 Roy Walter Purdy - Merchant Navy officer, propaganda broadcaster and informer at Colditz - guilty of treason - reports of his prosecution and trial in The Times available at  "reprieved on the grounds that [he] had been [a follower] in treason rather than [a leader] ... released from prison ... in December 1954... went to live with his ‘wife’ and child in Germany" - died in 1982. An alternative version is that 'Instead of trying to trace his German wife Margarete and his son, Purdy married his childhood sweetheart, never revealing his childhood past to his wife. For many years he worked as a quality control inspector in an Essex car factory. He died from lung cancer in 1982. A third version is that 'Walter Purdy was released from jail in 1954. He had a child called Stephan by a woman called Margaret Weitemeir born near Ravensbruck on 5 April 1945. Purdy planned to return to her but this never happened. He married his childhood sweetheart called Muriel in 1957 but she soon died. He married another lady in about 1960 and had a son. Walter Purdy died in Southend in 1982.
Theodore Schurch - Soldier - Guilty of treachery, executed on 4 January 1946
Duncan Scott-Ford - Merchant seaman - Guilty of treachery, executed on 3 November 1942

Gibraltar (UK Crown Dependency)
Jose Estelle Key - Civilian - Guilty of treachery, executed on 7 July 1942 at Wandsworth Prison, London, England

Czech Republic (British Special Operations Executive operation)
Karel Čurda - Soldier -  Guilty of treachery, executed on 29 April 1947. Betrayer of the Anglo-Czechoslovak army agents responsible for the assassination of top Nazi official Reinhard Heydrich in Prague.

United States
Robert Henry Best - Guilty, sentenced to life in prison. Died in prison in 1952.
Herbert John Burgman - Guilty, died in prison in 1953.
Velvalee Dickinson - Guilty, sentenced to 10 years in prison. Released in 1951, and died in 1980.
Mildred Gillars - Guilty, jailed, released in 1961. Known as Axis Sally, died in 1988.
Tomoya Kawakita - Guilty, sentenced to death, commuted to life imprisonment, released in 1963, and deported to Japan.
Martin James Monti - Guilty and served time in prison post World War II twice 1946-1947 and from 1948 to 1960. Died in 2000.
Ezra Pound - Poet and fascist propagandist - Deemed mentally unfit to stand trial. Died in 1972.

Notes and references

Notes

References

Allied traitors
Allied traitors